Lewis and Clark Trail State Park is a  Washington state park located on the Touchet River in Columbia County with both old-growth forest and  of river shoreline. The park offers camping, hiking, fishing, swimming, birdwatching, interpretive activities, wildlife viewing, and athletic fields.

References

External links
Lewis and Clark Trail State Park Washington State Parks and Recreation Commission 
Lewis and Clark Trail State Park Map Washington State Parks and Recreation Commission

State parks of Washington (state)
Parks in Columbia County, Washington